EAFP may refer to:

 It is easier to ask forgiveness than it is to get permission
 In programming, it refers to a practice of performing a possibly illegal operation without checking first whether this operation would succeed, and then handling the possible error, instead of checking ahead of time. This reduces the risk of time of check to time of use errors. In particular, this practice is encouraged in the Python programming language.
 European Association of Faculties of Pharmacy; See Faculty of Pharmacy, University of Lisbon

See also
 European Academy of Facial Plastic Surgery (EAFPS); See Alexander Berghaus